Albert Wells Baird (June 2, 1895 – November 27, 1976) was a Major League Baseball infielder who played parts of the 1917 and 1919 seasons for the New York Giants. Between his playing days he served in the military during World War I. Baird was born in Cleburne, Texas and died in Shreveport, Louisiana. He batted and threw right-handed. He went to college at Centenary College of Louisiana and Louisiana State University.

References

External links

1895 births
1976 deaths
Major League Baseball infielders
Baseball players from Louisiana
New York Giants (NL) players
Rochester Tribe players